The 1980 Montana State Bobcats football team represented the Montana State University as a member of the Big Sky Conference during the 1980 NCAA Division I-AA football season. Led by third-year head coach Sonny Lubick, the Bobcats compiled an overall record of 4–6 and a mark of 3–4 in conference play, tying for sixth place in the Big Sky.

Schedule

Roster

References

Montana State
Montana State Bobcats football seasons
Montana State Bobcats football